The 2018 World's Best Racehorse Rankings, sponsored by Longines was the 2018 edition of the World's Best Racehorse Rankings. It was an assessment of Thoroughbred racehorses issued by the International Federation of Horseracing Authorities (IFHA) on 24 January 2019. It included horses aged three or older which competed in flat races during 2018. It was open to all horses irrespective of where they raced or were trained.

Rankings for 2018
For a detailed guide to this table, see below.

Guide
A complete guide to the main table above.

References

World Thoroughbred Racehorse Rankings
World Thoroughbred Rankings 2018